Acacia dictyophleba, also known as the sandhill wattle, waxy wattle feather veined wattle, and spear tree, is a shrub belonging to the genus Acacia and the subgenus Phyllodineae. The Nyangumarta peoples know the plant as Langkur or Lungkun; the Thalanyji know it as Jabandi; and the Pintupi know it as mulyati.

Description
It blooms from March to September and produces yellow flowers. It is often sparingly branched with straight stems that are covered in light grey and smooth bark. The shiny phyllodes are dark green but age to grey-green or an attractive blue-grey colour. A white waxy surface bloom due to dry resin often covers he phyllodes. The heads are densely flowered with 40 to 60 or golden flowers per head. The shiny brown seeds within the pod are an obloid to ellipsoid shape.

Taxonomy
The species was first formally described by the botanist Ferdinand von Mueller in 1863 as part of the work Fragmenta Phytographiae Australiae. Synonyms for the species include; Acacia jensenii as described by Joseph Maiden and Racosperma dictyophlebum by Leslie Pedley.

The species name is derived from the Greek words diktyon meaning net and phlebo- meaning vein referring to the minor nerves of the phyllodes which form a coarse network.
The type specimen was collected by John McDouall Stuart near Mount Humphries in the Northern Territory during his last expedition.

A. dictyophleba is closely related to A.melleodora, A. jensenii and A. sabulosa.

Distribution
It is native to an area in the Goldfields-Esperance, Pilbara and Mid West regions of Western Australia. It grows well in red sandy soils and is found on sand dunes and stony plains. It is also found in the desert areas of inland Australia; southern part of the Northern Territory, north-eastern South Australia  and in southwest Queensland. It is quite common throughout the Simpson Desert. It is found in a range of soil types including stony loam, sandy loam or clay-loam. The shrub is often part of in tall open shrubland or open low woodland communities containing various Acacias and Eucalyptus species as well as spinifex and grassland communities. Sometimes small dense regrowth stands following fire will form.

Uses
The plant, also known by the name spear tree, is used to make spears and digging sticks by the Aboriginal people of the Little Sandy Desert. 

The seeds are edible and the phyllodes can be chewed like tobacco. The phyllodes can be brewed to make tea which can be used to treat colds and headaches. The bark contains tannins and are astringent and can be used to treat diarrhoea and dysentery. The wood can be used as a fuel and to make fence posts.

A. dictyophleba has potential as an ornamental plant, with its impressive flowering and attractive foliage. It is also a fast-growing tree that is also nitrogen fixing as well as frost- and drought-tolerant.

See also
List of Acacia species

References

dictyophleba
Acacias of Western Australia
Plants described in 1863
Flora of South Australia
Flora of Queensland
Flora of the Northern Territory
Taxa named by Ferdinand von Mueller